In the United States, a designated survivor (or designated successor) is a named individual in the presidential line of succession, chosen to stay at an undisclosed secure location, away from events such as State of the Union addresses and presidential inaugurations. The practice of designating a successor is intended to prevent a hypothetical decapitation of the government and to safeguard continuity in the office of the president in the event the president along with the vice president and multiple other officials in the presidential line of succession die in a mass-casualty incident. The procedure originated in the 1950s during the Cold War with its risk of nuclear attack.

If such an event occurred, the surviving official highest in the line of succession as delineated in the Presidential Succession Act of 1947, possibly the designated survivor, would become Acting President of the United States. The individual named as a designated survivor must be eligible to serve as president to ensure that the individual is able to provide continuity in government. In practice, the designated survivor is usually a member of the president's Cabinet, and is chosen by the president.

Being assigned as the designated survivor does not guarantee that this official will be the person to assume the presidency in such a situation. For the 2010 State of the Union Address, HUD Secretary Shaun Donovan was the designated survivor. However, Secretary of State Hillary Clinton was also absent from the address due to a conference in London; had a calamity occurred, Clinton, not Donovan, would have become Acting President as her office is higher in the line of succession.

Congress also designates members of the Senate and House, one from each party to become their own "designated survivor" to maintain the existence of Congress in the event of a mass-casualty event.

Selection
The process for selection of the designated survivor has been described by those involved to be entirely random. However, the character of the event for which a designated survivor is being selected may cause some officials to be avoided in the selection process.

List of designated survivors

Portrayal in media 
 In The West Wing episode He Shall, from Time to Time..., Josh Lyman is instructed to "pick a guy" (referring to the designated survivor) for when the President gives his State of the Union Address. Ultimately, Secretary of Agriculture Roger Tribbey is chosen. 
 The role was the focus of the 2016 political drama series Designated Survivor, in which Secretary of Housing and Urban Development Tom Kirkman (Kiefer Sutherland) is sworn in as president following a terrorist attack that destroys the United States Capitol. The show also features another designated survivor from Congress, a member of the Republican Party.

Notes

References

External links
 U.S. Senate's list of cabinet members who did not attend the State of the Union Address (since 1984)
 Cabinet Members Who Did Not Attend the State of the Union Address Reagan (1984) – Trump The American Presidency Project [online]. Gerhard Peters (database). Santa Barbara, California: University of California (hosted).

United States presidential succession
Disaster preparedness in the United States
Continuity of government in the United States